Secondary Highway 658, commonly referred to as Highway 658, is a provincially maintained highway in the Canadian province of Ontario, located in Kenora District. The highway extends  between the city of Kenora and the community of Redditt. For a decade, Highway 658 was numbered as Highway 666, leading to numerous sign thefts and a petition by members of a church on the route. This petition eventually led to the route being renumbered in late 1985.

Route description 
Highway 658 is a  highway located within Kenora District northwest of the city of Kenora. It travels through communities lying north of Highway 17A, the Trans-Canada Highway. It is mostly rural, being surrounded by ranches and equipment sheds as well as the boreal forest and rock outcroppings of the Canadian Shield. In the town of Redditt, the highway ends at a train station served by Via Rail.

History 
Highway 658 was originally designated on July 21, 1966, travelling north from Highway 17, west of Whitefish.
This route and most other secondary highways in the area were transferred to the Regional Municipality of Sudbury when it was established on January 1, 1973, and is now known as Greater Sudbury Municipal Road 4.

The current iteration of Highway 658 was originally designated as Highway 128, a route which came into existence on January 18, 1956. In 1975, the route was one of several King's Highways redesignated as Secondary Highways; it was given the number 666. Local citizen and two churches located along the route began to petition the MTO in 1982, requesting the number be changed due to concerns with its connotation as the "number of the beast". The route number was officially changed to 658 on November 1, 1985, though signs indicating "Formerly Highway 666" were attached to reassurance markers along the highway.

Major intersections

References

658
Roads in Kenora District
Transport in Kenora